503 may refer to:

503 (number)
503, a year
503, a track by Hans Zimmer on the Angels & Demons soundtrack
503 Service Unavailable, an HTTP status code
Area code 503, a North American telephone area code in northwestern Oregon
BMW 503, a luxury car
Country code +503, for El Salvador
FN 503, a semi-automatic pistol manufactured by FN Herstal
A type of jeans, commonly in Levi's and Edwin
A type of steel used for making bicycle frames